Charles Gandy (April 21, 1872 in Dijon – July 5, 1943 in Paris) was a French physician remembered for Gandy-Gamna nodules.

External links 

20th-century French physicians
1872 births
1943 deaths